This is the list of entries for the 2022 BWF World Championships qualification.

Overview

Events

Number of players/member association quota
This event's total limit of eligibility players is 400 players, the following charts are the rules and the distribution.

Participating players

Men's singles
According to the phase 2 updated by BWF, the following table is the invitation results.

Women's singles
According to the phase 2 updated by BWF, the following table is the invitation results.

Men's doubles
According to the phase 2 updated by BWF, the following table is the invitation results.

Women's doubles
According to the phase 2 updated by BWF, the following table is the invitation results.

Mixed doubles
According to the phase 2 updated by BWF, the following table is the invitation results.

References

External links 
BWF website

Qualification
Qualification for sports events